John Wesley "Boog" Powell (born August 17, 1941) is an American former professional baseball player. He played in Major League Baseball as a first baseman and left fielder from  through , most prominently as a member of the Baltimore Orioles dynasty that won four American League pennants and two World Series championships between 1966 and 1971. The four-time All-Star led the American League in 1964 with a .606 slugging percentage and won the American League Most Valuable Player Award in 1970. He also played for the Cleveland Indians and the Los Angeles Dodgers. In 1979, Powell was inducted into the Baltimore Orioles Hall of Fame.

In a 17-season career, Powell posted a .266 batting average with 339 home runs, 1187 RBI, .462 slugging percentage and a .361 on-base percentage in 2042 games. Powell hit three home runs in a game three times, and was second only to Eddie Murray on the Orioles' all-time home run list before Cal Ripken Jr. surpassed Powell in 1994. In 1983, Powell received five votes for the Hall of Fame (1.3% of all BBWAA voters) in his only appearance on the ballot.

Powell currently owns Boog's Barbecue, which sells barbecue sandwiches, pit beef, and ribs in two locations: on Eutaw Street at Oriole Park at Camden Yards, and at Ed Smith Stadium, Sarasota, Florida, during the spring training season.

Early life
Powell was born in Lakeland, Florida; he played for that city's team in the 1954 Little League World Series. After his family moved to Key West when he was 15, Powell played at Key West High School and graduated in 1959. Powell received the nickname "Boog" from his father. As Powell explained, "In the South they call little kids who are often getting into mischief buggers, and my dad shortened it to Boog."

Career

Baltimore Orioles

Powell signed with the Baltimore Orioles; Jim Russo (the scout who signed him) was also the scout who would sign Jim Palmer and Dave McNally.

In 1966, Powell, along with Frank Robinson and Brooks Robinson, led the Orioles to the World Series, where they surprised the baseball world by sweeping the Los Angeles Dodgers in four games to become baseball's world champions.

Before the 1968 season, Powell lamented, "once, just once, I'd like to go through a whole season without an injury", and he did just that, playing over 150 games each of the next three seasons. In 1969 he hit a career-high .304 with 37 home runs and 121 runs batted in, and in  he was the American League Most Valuable Player, hitting 35 home runs with 114 runs batted in and narrowly missed a .300 average during the last week of the season. In the 1970 World Series, Powell homered in the first two games as the Orioles defeated the Cincinnati Reds in five games. Prior to the 1971 season, Powell appeared on the cover of Sports Illustrated for the 1971 baseball preview issue. Powell helped Baltimore reach a third straight World Series that year, blasting a pair of home runs in game two of the 1971 ALCS against the up-and-coming Oakland Athletics, but he hit only .111 in the Series as Baltimore lost to the Pittsburgh Pirates in seven games.

Later career
Powell had been an American League all-star for four straight years (1968–1971). However, Oriole manager Earl Weaver believed in making liberal use of the platoon system; in 1973 and 1974, Powell fell victim to it, limiting his at-bats. He and Don Hood were traded to the Cleveland Indians for Dave Duncan and minor league outfielder Alvin McGrew on February 25 1975. Powell, again a regular with the Indians, batted .297 (with 129 hits) and 27 home runs (his best season since 1970), and a .997 fielding percentage. He was waived by the Indians during spring training on March 30, 1977. His final season was 1977, as a pinch-hitter for the  Los Angeles Dodgers. He hit .244 with no home runs and 5 RBI's. He was released on August 31, 1977.

In popular culture

In the 1970s and 1980s Powell appeared in more than ten different television commercials for Miller Lite beer, including a memorable one with umpire Jim Honochick. Playing on the theme of mocking umpires who make bad calls, the ad featured Honochick trying unsuccessfully to read the label on a beer bottle as Powell did the voice over. Borrowing Powell's glasses to bring the label into focus, and suddenly able to see who is standing next to him at the bar and providing the narration, Honochick exclaims, "Hey, you're Boog Powell!"

Powell is mentioned in an episode of Cheers entitled Sam at Eleven. The fictional star of Cheers, ex-Red Sox reliever Sam Malone, relates his greatest moment in the Major Leagues: retiring Boog Powell in both games of a doubleheader.

Powell is also mentioned in an episode of Bill Burr's Netflix original show F Is for Family. While searching for his wife after having an argument, Frank Murphy drives past a batting cage and hears the crack of the bat hitting a pitch. He then quips to his daughter Maureen, "That's either your mother or Boog Powell."

See also
List of Major League Baseball career home run leaders
List of Major League Baseball career runs batted in leaders

References

External links

 
Boog Powell - Baseballbiography.com

Baseball players from Florida
American League All-Stars
Baltimore Orioles players
Cleveland Indians players
Los Angeles Dodgers players
Major League Baseball first basemen
Sportspeople from Lakeland, Florida
People from Key West, Florida
1941 births
Living people
Bluefield Orioles players
Fox Cities Foxes players
Rochester Red Wings players
American League Most Valuable Player Award winners
Key West High School alumni